Eureka City Unified School District  is a public school district based in Humboldt County, California, United States. Eureka City Schools Administration is located in Eureka, California.

The district oversees 12 schools:
 Alice Birney School K–5
 Eureka Adult School
 Eureka High School 9–12
 Grant School K–5
 Lafayette School K–5
 Lincoln School K–5 (closed pre-2013)
 Washington School K–5
 Winship Middle School 6–8
 Winzler Children's Center
 Zane Middle School 7–8
 Zoe Barnum High School

References

External links
 
 "Eureka City Schools board planning to renovate Lincoln, sell district offices" , Allison White, Eureka Times-Standard, January 28, 2011

School districts in Humboldt County, California